Cecil Alexander may refer to:

 Cecil Alexander (architect) (1918–2013), American architect
 Cecil L. Alexander (born 1935), American politician in Arkansas
 Cecil Frances Alexander (1818–1895), hymn-writer and poet